Bushehr Airport  is a joint civil and military international airport in Bushehr, Iran.

Airlines and destinations

See also
Iran Civil Aviation Organization
Transport in Iran
List of airports in Iran
List of the busiest airports in Iran
List of airlines of Iran
Bushehr
Iran

References

Airports in Iran
Transportation in Bushehr Province
Buildings and structures in Bushehr Province